The unified civil number is a 10-digit unique number assigned to each Bulgarian citizen. It serves as a national identification number. An EGN is assigned to Bulgarians at birth, or when a birth certificate is issued. The uniform system for civil registration and administrative service of population (abbreviated: ЕСГРАОН, ESGRAON) regulates the EGN system.

Structure

The initial six digits correspond to the birth date. The first two digits are the last two digits of the year, and the last two digits are the day of the month. For people born between 1900 and 1999 the middle digits are the month number: YYMMDD. For people born before 1900, 20 is added to the month: YY M+20 DD. For people born from 2000, 40 is added to the month: YY M+40 DD.

The next three digits designate the birth order number, the third digit being even for males and odd for females. Each district is assigned a range of three-digit numbers, used consecutively, altering even and odd numbers between males and females born on the particular day. In rare cases a district may not have enough numbers, so numbers are "borrowed" from an adjacent district.

A check digit, calculated from the nine digits using the following algorithm, is appended:
1 Each digit is multiplied by its weight; the weight for the nth digit is 2n modulo 11:
{| class="wikitable"
|-
! Position
| 1 || 2 || 3 || 4 || 5 || 6 || 7 || 8 || 9
|-
! Weight
| x2 ||  x4 ||  x8 ||  x5 || x10 ||  x9 ||  x7 ||  x3 ||  x6
|}

2 The products obtained are added
3 The resulting sum modulo 11 is the check digit

Examples

Calculation
The first female registered born on 2 January 1975 has number 75 (1975) 01 (January + 0) 02 (2nd) 001 (district has numbers, say, 0-50, and this is first female of this date) & check digit, i.e. 750102001 & check digit.
7x2 + 5x4 + 0x8 + 1x5 + 0x10 + 2x9 + 0x7 + 0x3 + 1x9 = 52; divide by 11, (quotient is 4, ignore), remainder 8 is check digit. So EGN is 7501020018.

Valid EGN numbers

 7523169263 — a male, born on 16 March 1875
 8032056031 — a female, born on 5 December 1880
 8001010008 — a male, born on 1 January 1980
 7501020018 — a female, born on 2 January 1975
 7552010005 — a male, born on 1 December 2075
 7542011030 — a female, born on 1 February 2075

Misuse

In order to easily cross borders criminals have been known to change EGNs. There were 46 such cases detected in March 2005.

Using the EGN system for identification raised some privacy concerns, though they are officially considered personal information and are protected by law.

See also

 National identification number
 Canada - Social insurance number
 United States - Social Security number
 United Kingdom - National Insurance number
 Australia - Tax file number
 France - INSEE code
 Spain -  NIE Number
 Ireland - PPS number
 Brazil - Cadastro de Pessoas Físicas
 Yugoslavia - Unique Master Citizen Number
 Citizenship of the European Union
 Bulgarian passport
 Bulgarian identity card
 Bulgarian nationality law
 Driving licence in Bulgaria

External links
 A paper, Integrated Information System for Demographic Statistics 'ESGRAON-TDS' in Bulgaria

Law of Bulgaria
National identification numbers